Civic Plaza is a Tide Light Rail station in Norfolk, Virginia. It opened in 2011 and is located in the plaza in front of Norfolk City Hall, just east of St. Pauls Boulevard.

The station is adjacent to several government buildings and is just north of Dominion Tower and the Elizabeth River waterfront.

References

External links 
Civic Plaza station

Tide Light Rail stations
Railway stations in the United States opened in 2011
2011 establishments in Virginia